Austrodinychus is a genus of mites in the family Nenteriidae.

Species
 Austrodinychus brasiliensis (Wisniewski & Hirschmann, 1985)     
 Austrodinychus canadiensis (Hirschmann, 1978)     
 Austrodinychus catarinae (Wisniewski & Hirschmann, 1985)     
 Austrodinychus chiapasus (Hirschmann, 1978)     
 Austrodinychus cubanus (Wisniewski & Hirschmann, 1990)     
 Austrodinychus diademata (Vitzthum, 1921)     
 Austrodinychus fungivorus (Hirschmann, 1978)     
 Austrodinychus ghanae (Hirschmann & Wisniewski, 1985)     
 Austrodinychus guatemalae (Hirschmann & Wisniewski, 1985)     
 Austrodinychus howdeni (Hirschmann, 1978)     
 Austrodinychus makilingensis (Hirschmann & Hiramatsu, 1990)     
 Austrodinychus martini (Hirschmann, 1978)     
 Austrodinychus masculinatus (Vitzthum, 1935)     
 Austrodinychus mexicanus (Hirschmann, 1978)     
 Austrodinychus micronychus Trägårdh, 1952     
 Austrodinychus moseri (Hirschmann, 1972)     
 Austrodinychus obovata (Hirschmann & Wisniewski, 1985)     
 Austrodinychus okumurai (Hiramatsu, 1979)     
 Austrodinychus papuae (Hirschmann & Wisniewski, 1985)     
 Austrodinychus ruizae (Hirschmann & Wisniewski, 1985)     
 Austrodinychus sellnicki (Hirschmann & Wisniewski, 1985)     
 Austrodinychus spumans (Hirschmann, 1972)     
 Austrodinychus sturmi (Hirschmann & Wisniewski, 1985)     
 Austrodinychus sumapazae (Hirschmann & Wisniewski, 1985)     
 Austrodinychus tenuis (Hirschmann & Wisniewski, 1985)     
 Austrodinychus yonaguniensis (Hiramatsu, 1980)

References

Mesostigmata